Morvan Marchal (31 July 1900, Vitré, Ille-et-Vilaine – 13 August 1963, Paris), is the Breton name of Maurice Marchal, an architect and a militant Breton nationalist. He is best known for having designed the national flag of Brittany.

Biography
A former pupil of the Saint Martin's day college of Rennes, Marchal went on to study architecture at the Rennes School of Art. In 1918 he joined the Breton Regionalist Union and became involved with its journal Breiz Atao ("Brittany Always!") and the nationalist youth movement Breton Youth.

In 1923 he designed the Breton national flag Gwenn ha du ("Black and White"). An artist, poet and illustrator, he participated in many Breton publications, political and intellectual. He also belonged to "Seiz Breur", a group of Breton artists.

He took part in the creation of the Breton Separatist Party (PAB) at the first congress of Breiz Atao, held in September 1927 at Rosporden. He was a member of the party's management committee. In constant conflict with the pro-Nazi nationalist Olier Mordrel, he finally broke with Breiz Atao.

At the 11 April 1931 congress, the PAB split. Mordrel set up the fascist Breton National Party, and Marchal joined the moderate Breton Federalist League, from which in 1932 he founded  the journal Federal Brittany. In 1934, he joined the Breton Federalist Movement, with Y. Gestalen, Francis Bayer of Kern, Goulven Mazéas and Rafig Tullou. In 1938 he signed the manifesto of the Breton federalists, which affirmed:

...the pressing duty to gather those of our compatriots who do not want to confuse Brittany with the Church; Brittany with reaction; Brittany with puerile anti-French bias; Brittany with capitalism; and even less, Brittany with racism.

Marchal turned to philosophical and occult studies, associated with Druidic revivalism. With other members of the Breton Federalist Movement, he founded the neo-Pagan "Kredenn Geltiek Hollvedel" (World Celtic Creed) group, of which he was the first arch-Druid. The group is separate from the Gorsedd of Brittany.

Wartime activity and later life

During the war, Marchal was not associated with the pro-Nazi activities of Mordrel and his followers. However his group Kredenn Geltiek Hollvedel published a Druidic journal, Nemeton, one of the goals of which was to denounce Catholic influence in Brittany in the name of a supposed Aryan (Indo-European) cultural fraternity which bound a Nordic "New Europe" to the Celtic fatherland in Germany.

Following the Liberation of France he suffered from the association of Breton nationalism with collaborationism. He left Brittany to live in Paris, where he worked installing gas. He continued to contribute to some journals, such as Marius Lepage's Le Symbolisme. He died in poverty in 1963 in the commonroom of the Lariboisière hospital.

A street of the district of Poultière in the North-East of Vitré has been named after him.

Morvan Marchal was buried in Paris in 1963 and re-buried in the family grave in Châteaugiron, near Rennes in Brittany on 24 January 1997.

References

Bibliography
The Breton movement. Published by real Brittany 1954

1900 births
1963 deaths
People from Vitré, Ille-et-Vilaine
Breton Autonomist Party politicians
Breton Federalist League politicians
Founders of modern pagan movements
French modern pagans